RAF Worthy Down was a Royal Air Force station built in 1918,  north of Winchester, Hampshire, England. After it was transferred to Royal Navy control in 1939 as RNAS Worthy Down (HMS Kestrel), the airfield remained in use throughout the Second World War and then housed an engineering school from 1952. The airfield was in use until 1960. The site is now Worthy Down Camp.

History

The site was first used as a military establishment when the War Office acquired the site for a Wireless and Observers School in 1917 before changing to the school of Army Co-operation in 1918 on the site of the Winchester Racecourse. In 1918 an airfield was built for the Royal Flying Corps (RFC), but before it was completed the RFC was amalgamated with the Royal Naval Air Service to form the Royal Air Force. Nonetheless, the RFC do seem to have operated there to some degree prior to amalgamation, as Lieutenant Harold Percy Dawson, RFC, was killed in an air accident stated to be at Worthy Down on 9 March 1918.

Royal Air Force
The first squadron to use the airfield was No. 58 Squadron RAF which was reformed there on 1 April 1924. The squadron flew the Vimy and the Virginia before moving to RAF Upper Heyford on 13 January 1936. On 7 April 1927 No. 7 Squadron RAF moved from RAF Bircham Newton and stayed until 3 September 1936 flying the Virginia IX/X and the Heyford II/III before moving to RAF Finningley. During this No. 102 Squadron RAF formed at the airfield flying the Heyford II/III on 1 October 1935 before leaving on 3 September 1936 moving to RAF Finningley. On 1 October 1939 the same day as when 102 Sqn formed No. 215 Squadron RAF also reformed at the airfield but they flew the Virginia X instead and left on 14 March 1936 moving to RAF Upper Heyford.

On 8 August 1936 No. 49 Squadron RAF moved from RAF Bircham Newton flying the Hawker Hind before leaving on 14 March 1938 moving to RAF Scampton. The next squadron to join was No. 35 Squadron RAF. The squadron moved to RAF Worth Down on 26 August 1936 flying the Fairey Gordon, Vickers Wellesley and the Fairey Battle before moving to RAF Cottesmore on 20 April 1938. The last squadron to join RAF Worthy Down was No. 207 Squadron RAF which had moved to the airfield on 29 August 1936 flying the Gordon and Wellesley before leaving on 20 April 1938 to RAF Cottesmore.

The only Royal Air Force Squadron to use the airfield when it was under Royal Naval control was the Southampton University Air Squadron, which flew their Tiger Moth trainers there during 1945–46.

Station commanders

data from

Royal Navy
The site was recommissioned by the Royal Navy in 1939 as HMS Kestrel and used as a flying station by the Fleet Air Arm. During this time the site was featured on the news when Lord Haw-Haw (William Joyce) claimed HMS Kestrel was sunk by the Kriegsmarine. In 1950 it was placed in a state of care and maintenance until 1952 when it was re-established as HMS Ariel II and used as an engineering training school.

The following squadrons were based at Worthy Down at some point:

700 Naval Air Squadron between June 1945 and 1945
734 Naval Air Squadron used the airfield between February 1944 and sometime in 1945 with the Armstrong Whitworth Whitley GRVII.
739 Naval Air Squadron (BADU) between September 1943 and September 1944 with the Airspeed Oxford.
755 Naval Air Squadron formed at the airfield during 1939 and flew various aircraft including the Blackburn Shark, Hawker Osprey, Westland Lysander and Curtiss SO3C Seamew.
756 Naval Air Squadron - 1939 - 1943
757 Naval Air Squadron - 1939 - 1943
763 Naval Air Squadron - December 1939 - June 1940
763 (FAA Pool) Naval Air Squadron - February - July 1941
800 Naval Air Squadron - 1938 - 1939
803 Naval Air Squadron - 21 November 1938
806 Naval Air Squadron - May 1940
807 Naval Air Squadron - 15 September 1940
808 Naval Air Squadron - 1 July 1940 – 5 September 1940
811 Naval Air Squadron - October 1939
 815 Naval Air Squadron - 15 October 1939 - May 1940
822 Naval Air Squadron - October 1939
848 Naval Air Squadron - November 1959 - March 1960
Air Electrical School - June 1952 - 1 November 1960

Additionally Supermarine used the airfield in the development of the Spitfire from December 1940 to March 1944.

Current use
The technical site is now Worthy Down Camp with the runway area open grassland.

See also
 Worthy Down railway station
 List of former Royal Air Force stations

References

Citations

Bibliography

External links
 Airfield Information Exchange - RAF Worthy Down

Royal Air Force stations in Hampshire
Royal Air Force stations of World War II in the United Kingdom
Buildings and structures in Hampshire
Airports in Hampshire